Gordon Douglas may refer to:

Gordon Douglas (director) (1907–1993), American film director
Gordon Douglas (monk), the first Western monk in Buddhism

See also
Sandy Douglass (Gordon K. Douglass), sailor
Gordon, Douglas County, Wisconsin